Subliminable Messages is the sixth album by Ten Foot Pole. The title refers to a Bushism.

Track listing
"Wake Up (And Smell the Fascism)" - 2:42  
"Kicked Out of Kindergarten" - 2:48       
"She Looks Like" - 1:52  
"Rachel Corrie" - 2:57  
"Black and Blue" - 2:52  
"Last Call for Russell's Balls" - 2:52  
"With You by My Side" - 2:27  
"Still Believe" - 2:09  
"Your World" - 2:48  
"Heaven and Hell" - 2:44  
"The Quest" - 2:33  
"Toss It All" - 3:22

Credits
Dennis Jagard: vocals and guitar 
Kevin Ruggeri: drums and vocals 
Mike Levy: bass and vocals 
Eric Cody: lead guitar

References

Ten Foot Pole albums
2004 albums
Go-Kart Records albums